Alexander Taylor Milne (January 1906 – 1994) was an English historian and the secretary and librarian of the Royal Historical Society. He was responsible for the compilation of a number of bibliographies of historical sources, as well as the editing of two volumes of the correspondence of Jeremy Bentham.

References 

English historians
English librarians
English bibliographers
English editors
Jeremy Bentham
1906 births
1994 deaths